Kyla Briana Ross (born October 24, 1996) is a retired American artistic gymnast and current assistant coach for the Arkansas Razorbacks gymnastics team. She is the first female gymnast to win NCAA, World, and Olympic championship titles.

Ross was an elite gymnast from 2009 to 2016. She was a member of the U.S. Women's Gymnastics team at the 2012 Summer Olympics; dubbed the Fierce Five, the squad won the gold medal in the team competition. Ross was the 2013 world all-around, uneven bars, and balance beam silver medalist. At the 2014 World Artistic Gymnastics Championships, she was a member of the gold medal-winning U.S. team and the all-around bronze medalist.

In February 2016, she retired from elite gymnastics to attend college. That fall, she enrolled at the University of California, Los Angeles (UCLA) and joined the university's NCAA gymnastics team. She was named eleven times as an All-American, earning first team regular season honors on bars and beam in 2017, first team honors for the post season on bars, beam, and the all-around, first team regular season honors in 2018 on bars and the all-around and first team honors for the postseason on bars, beam, and the all-around and second team honors on floor exercise. On March 16, 2019, she became the 11th NCAA gymnast to achieve a "Gym Slam", having earned a perfect 10 score on all four apparatuses. One week later, she became the second NCAA gymnast, after Maggie Nichols, to achieve a second Gym Slam.

Personal life 
Ross was born on October 24, 1996, in Honolulu, Hawaii, to Kiana and Jason Ross. Her mother is of Filipino, German, and Puerto Rican descent and her father is of African American and Japanese ancestry. Her father was a minor league outfielder for six years. She has two younger siblings, McKenna and Kayne. Her sister McKenna played for the Hawaii Rainbow Wahine volleyball team.

After Ross and her family moved to California, she met McKayla Maroney at her gym. The two quickly became best friends; they lived near each other and would carpool together to practices, and they had sleepovers together almost every weekend. As young gymnasts, they both fantasized about going to the Olympics someday. Both would earn spots on the team for the 2012 Summer Olympics in London. In an interview, Maroney said, "We've known each other since we were six years old... we will always be best friends."

Ross attended Aliso Niguel High School in Aliso Viejo, California. Even after making the 2012 Olympic team, Ross decided to maintain her amateur eligibility and compete in NCAA gymnastics. She committed to UCLA in 2015 and graduated from high school in the same year, but deferred college enrollment to vie for a spot on the 2016 Olympic team. In early 2016, Ross announced her retirement from Elite gymnastics, and in the fall she began her collegiate career as a Bruin at UCLA. She pursued a major in molecular, cell and developmental biology, graduating in 2021.

On August 16, 2018, Ross came forward as a survivor of Larry Nassar's sexual abuse alongside fellow Olympian and UCLA teammate Madison Kocian.

Early gymnastics career 

Ross's mother has said that her daughter was always very strong, with a lot of energy: "She was born with muscles. We would go to the park and everybody would say, 'Whose baby is on top of that jungle gym?' And I would say, 'Oh, that's my baby. Don't worry about her, she's fine.'" Her father added, "It would use all my effort to get her to sit in her car seat, and I'm a pretty big guy, a strong guy. When she was born, we were like, 'Oh my goodness, she has triceps, she has quads hanging off her. What the heck's going on?' And she was just super strong. I mean, at an early age, she was able to walk across the monkey bars, just hanging herself."

Ross began gymnastics when she was three years old at Greenville Gymnastics Training Center in Greenville, South Carolina. She later trained at Richmond Olympiad in Virginia and National Gymnastics Training Center in Aliso Viejo before moving to Gym-Max Gymnastics in Costa Mesa, California in 2005. Her coach, Jenny Zhang, was skeptical about Ross's future in gymnastics because "she had this square body, no legs, square shoulders." But, fellow coach Howie Liang replied, "Don't worry about her. She will have long legs."

Ross found early success as a competitive gymnast. Between 2005 and 2007, she won five state titles and two national titles. She competed as a level 10 gymnast in 2008. At that year's state championships, she won titles on uneven bars, balance beam, floor exercise, and in the all-around. She added another title on balance beam and a second-place finish in the all-around at the regional championships. At the 2008 Junior Olympic national championships, she won the balance beam, floor exercise, and all-around titles and finished second on vault.

Elite gymnastics career

Junior

2009 
Ross qualified as a junior elite gymnast at the Metroplex Challenge in February. In April, she competed at the American Classic in San Diego, California. She placed second in the all-around with a score of 55.316.

In July, at the CoverGirl Classic in Des Moines, Iowa, she placed first in the all-around with a score of 57.000, handily beating future Olympic teammates Aly Raisman and McKayla Maroney. She also placed first on vault with a score of 15.200, fifth on balance beam with a score of 13.950, and fifth on floor with a score of 14.250.

In August, she competed at the Visa Championships in Dallas, Texas. She said, "It's a dream come true to compete in the Visas. I've watched it since I was 7." In only her second elite meet, she placed first in the all-around with a two-day combined score of 114.000, beating former junior national team member Bridgette Caquatto by more than half a point. She earned two event titles as well: She placed first on vault, performing a double-twisting Yurchenko and scoring 30.350 over two days, and first on balance beam with a combined score of 29.00. She also won the bronze medal on floor exercise, where she performed to the theme song from Rawhide and earned a two-day total of 28.200.

At the Junior Pan American Championships in Aracaju, Brazil, in November, she and teammates Caquatto, Raisman, and Sabrina Vega beat the second-place Canadian team by almost 15 points. Ross also placed first in the all-around with a score of 57.400, beating Vega by more than a point. In the event finals, she placed first on uneven bars (14.150), first on balance beam (15.000), and second on floor (13.800) behind Raisman.

2010 
In March, Ross competed at the City of Jesolo Trophy in Jesolo, Italy, where she placed second in the all-around (56.700) behind Anastasia Grishina of Russia. The following month, she competed at the 2010 Pacific Rim Gymnastics Championships in Melbourne, Australia. The team, which included junior gymnasts Ross and Jordyn Wieber and senior gymnasts Raisman and Rebecca Bross, won the gold medal, beating China by more than 15 points. Individually, Ross placed second behind Wieber in the all-around with a total score of 58.000. She also won a gold medal on vault (15.100), and silver on uneven bars (14.250) and floor exercise (14.200).

In July, at the CoverGirl Classic in Chicago, she placed third behind Wieber and Katelyn Ohashi in the all-around (58.700), first on balance beam (15.250), fourth on vault (15.200) and uneven bars (14.550), and eighth on floor exercise (13.700).

The following month, she competed at the Visa Championships in Hartford, Connecticut as the defending junior national champion. Despite a fall on uneven bars during her warm-up, she earned the highest score on the event on Day 1 of the competition (14.050). And despite a mistake on uneven bars on Day 2, she finished strong on balance beam (15.45) to win her second straight junior all-around title with a two-day combined score of 116.450. She won the national title on balance beam (29.900) and placed third on vault (30.450), third on floor (28.500), and seventh on uneven bars (27.600).

In September, she competed at the Pan American Championships in Guadalajara, Mexico. She and teammates Vega, Maroney, Gabby Douglas, Brenna Dowell, and Sarah Finnegan beat silver medalist Canada by nearly 20 points. Individually, she placed first in the all-around (57.998), ahead of Vega and Jessica López of Venezuela, She won the silver medal on floor (14.075) and sixth on uneven bars (13.350).

2011 
Ross again competed at the City of Jesolo Trophy in March. She and teammates Ohashi, Madison Kocian, Lexie Priessman, Elizabeth Price, and Ericha Fassbender won the team event over Russia by more than ten points. She also won the all-around competition with a score of 58.750. Grishina, who had bested her the year before, finished fifth.

At the CoverGirl Classic in Chicago in July, Ross finished first in the all-around (58.850) and on uneven bars (15.000), second on vault (15.250), third on floor exercise (13.950), and fourth on balance beam (14.650).

She entered the Visa Championships in Saint Paul, Minnesota in August as the two-time defending junior champion. She struggled on Day 1, falling on a double pike on floor exercise and vaulting an Amanar that was devalued to a double-twisting Yurchenko. On Day 2, she earned full credit for her Amanar, and her all-around total for the day bested Ohashi's, 60.150 to 60.000. However, she finished with a two-day total of 117.65 to Ohashi's 120.95 and earned the all-around silver medal. She also placed second to Ohashi on uneven bars (29.600) and balance beam (30.450), and finished sixth on floor (27.650).

Senior

2012 

Because her 16th birthday fell within the calendar year, Ross became a senior elite gymnast in 2012 and was eligible to compete at the Olympics. In March, she competed at the 2012 Pacific Rim Gymnastics Championships in Everett, Washington. The U.S. team consisted of senior gymnasts Ross, Wieber, and Douglas, and junior gymnasts Priessman, Ohashi, and Amelia Hundley. They easily won the competition, beating silver medalist China by nearly 20 points. Individually, Ross placed second in the all-around (59.200) behind Wieber, the reigning world all-around champion. In the event finals, she earned gold on balance beam (15.375), silver on uneven bars (15.050), and bronze on floor exercise (14.375).

Later that month, Ross competed at the City of Jesolo Trophy for the third straight year. The U.S. team (consisting of Ross, Bross, Brianna Brown, Dowell, Finnegan, Maroney, Price, Raisman, and Mykayla Skinner) again earned an easy victory, finishing more than ten points ahead of silver medalist Italy. Ross also won the all-around competition (59.850) ahead of Raisman and Finnegan. She finished the competition by claiming titles on uneven bars (15.050) and balance beam (15.500) and a bronze medal on vault (15.550).

In May, Ross competed at the Secret U.S. Classic in Chicago. She placed second in the all-around (59.800) behind Raisman, second on uneven bars (15.450), fifth on balance beam (14.700), and fifth on floor (14.350).

The following month, Ross competed at the Visa Championships in St. Louis, Missouri. She placed fourth in the all-around (59.750) on Day 1 and earned the highest score of the day on uneven bars (15.500). She also tied with reigning Olympic all-around champion Nastia Liukin for fourth place on beam (15.100). On Day 2, she improved her all-around score to 60.200. She finished fourth overall, behind Wieber, Douglas, and Raisman, with a two-day combined total of 119.950. In the event finals, she earned the silver medal on uneven bars (30.850) behind Douglas. She also placed fourth on balance beam (30.100) and sixth on floor (28.650).

At the beginning of July, Ross competed at the Olympic Trials in San Jose, California. She placed fifth in the all-around with a two-day combined score of 120.000. She also tied for first on uneven bars, scoring 31.150, and placed third on balance beam, scoring 29.950. Afterward, she was chosen as a member of the team that would be sent to the 2012 Summer Olympics. She said, "This is the most surreal feeling. Hearing my name called, I couldn't even believe it."

Ross was featured on the cover of Sports Illustrated with the rest of the U.S. women's Olympic gymnastics team in the July 18, 2012 "Olympic Preview" issue. It was the first time an entire Olympic gymnastics team had been featured on the cover of Sports Illustrated.

London Olympics 

At the end of July, Ross competed at the 2012 Summer Olympics in London, United Kingdom. She helped the American team, nicknamed the "Fierce Five", qualify first to the team final, and individually, she qualified as the second reserve for the uneven bars final with a score of 14.866. In the team final, she contributed scores of 14.933 on uneven bars and 15.133 on balance beam toward the American team's gold-medal finish.

2013 
Ross was slated to compete at the 2013 American Cup but withdrew because of an ankle injury. However, she performed an exhibition balance beam routine after the competition had ended.

In March, she was chosen to be a part of the U.S. European tour team that would compete in the City of Jesolo Trophy and in the USA-Germany-Romania Tri-Meet in Chemnitz, Germany. At Jesolo, she won gold medals in the team and uneven bars competitions, and silvers in the all-around and on balance beam. At the Chemnitz meet, she contributed to the U.S.'s first-place finish and won the all-around with a total score of 59.300, thus becoming the last gymnast to beat Simone Biles at an international all-around competition.

At the Secret U.S. Classic in July, Ross won gold medals in the all-around and on uneven bars and a silver medal on balance beam. At the P&G Championships in August, she finished second in the all-around and won gold on uneven bars and balance beam. She was invited to the qualifying camp for the 2013 World Artistic Gymnastics Championships, and on September 15, she was one of four gymnasts named to that team.

The World Championships took place in October in Antwerp, Belgium. In the all-around final, Ross started on vault, performing a double-twisting Yurchenko (15.366). She went on to score 15.100 on bars, 14.533 on beam, and 14.333 on floor, earning the silver medal with a total of 59.332. She scored 15.266 and finished in second place in the uneven bars final, behind Huang Huidan, and placed second in the balance beam final with a score of 14.833, 0.067 behind Aliya Mustafina. She was also awarded the Longines Prize for Elegance along with male gymnast Kohei Uchimura of Japan. The award is given to the male and female gymnast who displayed the most charisma, charm, and elegance as determined by a voting jury.

2014 

Ross was selected to compete at the 2014 American Cup but withdrew because of a back injury. In March, she competed at the City of Jesolo Trophy, where she won gold medals in the team and all-around competitions. She also won silver on uneven bars and floor exercise, but finished sixth on balance beam. The following month, she competed at the Pacific Rim Championships in Richmond, Canada. She won gold medals with the team and on balance beam, and took silver in the all-around and on uneven bars and floor exercise.

In August, Ross competed at the Secret U.S. Classic, where she finished first on beam, second in the all-around and on floor, and third on uneven bars. Later that month, she competed at the P&G Championships and finished second in the all-around, first on balance beam, sixth on uneven bars, and fifth on floor. Despite several mistakes on the first day, she was named to her third consecutive senior national team.

On September 17, Ross was selected to compete at the 2014 World Championships in Nanning, China. Alongside teammates Alyssa Baumann, Simone Biles, Madison Kocian, Ashton Locklear, and Mykayla Skinner, she won gold in the team final. Individually, despite dealing with hip and groin injuries, she qualified to the all-around and balance beam finals. She was also second reserve for the uneven bars final. In the all-around, she unexpectedly won the bronze medal after mistakes from Mustafina and Yao Jinnan of China. She also placed sixth in the balance beam final.

2015

UCLA

On February 22, 2015, Ross announced on Twitter that she had committed to the University of California, Los Angeles's gymnastics team where her former Fierce Five teammate, Jordyn Wieber, was team manager. Ross signed the National Letter of Intent to the Bruins on April 15, 2015, deferring until the 2016–17 season.

Secret U.S. Classic

On July 25, she competed at the Secret U.S. Classic, competing only on uneven bars and balance beam because of a bruised heel she sustained during training. She had two falls on uneven bars while trying to debut a new routine, which included a Chow (stalder Shaposhnikova) connected to a Bhardwaj (full-twisting Pak salto). She hit her ribs on the low bar after her Bhardwaj and fell. She restarted her routine but fell on a handstand while performing a toe-on full pirouette. She then restarted the routine a third time, this time removing the full twist in the Pak salto and only doing toe-on pirouettes. She dismounted with a double front, a new dismount for her, and scored a very low 12.250 (5.9 difficulty), finishing 15th on the event. She regained her composure and had a better performance on beam, despite a wobble on her side somi, and scored a respectable 14.550, placing fourth behind Worlds teammate and 2-Time World Champion Simone Biles and Olympic teammates Gabby Douglas and Aly Raisman. After the competition she shared her hopes to make major improvements in her routines and return to compete in the all-around at the P&G Championships.

P&G Championships

On August 13 & 15, Ross competed at the 2015 P&G Championships, competing in the all-around with a new floor routine. However, on Night 1, she put her hands down on her last tumbling pass on floor (double tuck) and scored a 13.550. She moved up in the rankings a little bit with a good double-twisting Yurchenko vault one rotation later, scoring a 15.050. On the uneven bars she executed her Bhardwaj (full-twisting Pak Salto) and nailed her Jaeger release, but under-rotated her double front dismount and sat it down, scoring a 14.050. On beam she had a sub-par routine, scoring a 14.250. She ended Night 1 in 12th place, tied with 2015 Pan Am Games team gold medalist Megan Skaggs, with a total all-around score of 56.900.

The first 2 rotations on Night 2 did not go according to plan for Ross either. She under-rotated her double-twisting Yurchenko and scored a 14.550. On bars, she was able to control her Bhardwaj transition but came close on her Jaeger release. She once again under-rotated her double front dismount and sat it down again. She scored a 14.050, same score on Night 1, for a total of 28.100, placing her 12th overall in event standings. She regained her composure with an excellent beam routine that scored a 15.250. Her total of 29.500 placed her 3rd on the event behind Simone Biles and Alyssa Baumann. On floor, she did not do a connection following her Double Arabian (taking out her preferred stag jump) and under-rotated her double tuck dismount but put it to her feet. She scored a 13.800 and had a total of 27.350, placing 12th on the event.

Despite her mistakes, she placed 10th in the All-Around with a score of 114.550, behind Biles, Maggie Nichols, Olympic teammate Aly Raisman, Bailie Key, Olympic teammate Gabby Douglas, Madison Kocian, Alyssa Baumann, Mykayla Skinner, and Nia Dennis. She was named to the Senior National Team for the 4th consecutive year, clinching the final spot by edging out Brenna Dowell and receiving an invitation to the 2015 Worlds Selection Camp. After being named to team's nominative roster, Ross withdrew from the Selection Camp and thus could not compete at the world championships.

2016 
On February 22, 2016, Ross revealed through the social network platform Twitter that she would retire from elite gymnastics with immediate effect. She had decided not to pursue the 2016 Olympic Games in Rio de Janeiro, and would instead focus on competing in collegiate gymnastics for the Bruins program at the University of California, Los Angeles (UCLA), where she enrolled the following September. This came two days before fellow Fierce Five teammate McKayla Maroney's retirement.

NCAA career

2016–2017 season
Ross began attending the University of California, Los Angeles in the fall of 2016, thus joining the UCLA Bruins gymnastics program. Her collegiate debut came on January 7, 2017, in a home dual meet against the University of Arkansas where she placed first on the uneven bars (9.875) in a tie with two of her teammates, third on vault (9.875), and eighth on balance beam (9.700). At the same meet, Ross and 2016 Olympic gold medalist Madison Kocian made history by becoming the first Olympic gold medalists to compete as NCAA gymnasts.

At the 2017 Pac-12 Championship, Ross captured the 2017 Pac-12 Balance Beam title by scoring the first-ever Perfect 10 on beam at the Championship meet. She was also named the 2017 Pac-12 Freshman of the Year (UCLA's first since 2011).

Ross finished the 2017 regular season ranked nationally 1st on uneven bars, 4th on balance beam and 19th on vault. On March 21, 2017, Ross earned first-team All-Pac-12 honors on vault, uneven bars and balance beam. On March 27, 2017, Ross earned first-team regular season All-American honors  on uneven bars and balance beam.

Ross continued her success at the 2017 NCAA championships. Despite falling on both of her floor exercise routines during the regular season, she performed her routine well during the semifinals, scoring a career-high 9.825. She finished with career-high 39.575 in the all around and placed 6th—the top all around placement for the Bruins. She also won national balance beam title with a 9.9625 and a share of the uneven bars title with a 9.95 in a six-way tie. By earning these two national titles, Ross made history as the first female gymnast to become an Olympic, World and NCAA Champion.

2017–2018 season
Prior to the 2018 season, Ross increased her training intensity with the goal of consistently competing all around during the regular season. Ultimately, she earned First team regular season All-American honors in the all-around and the Uneven Bars, the latter of which she tied for first in regular season individual rankings for the second straight season. Prior to the NCAA championships, she picked up PAC 12 championship titles on bars and the all around, and regional titles on Bars and Beam. At the NCAA championships Ross competed all-around for UCLA. She performed well, scoring 9.850 on vault, 9.950 on Bars, 9.950 on beam and 9.8875 on floor to score a 39.6375 in the all-around, helping qualify UCLA to the Super Six.  These scores also allowed her to finish 2nd on Beam, 3rd on Bars and 4th in the All-around individually. She performed all-around again for the Bruins in the Super Six Finals. Beginning on floor she made an uncharacteristic mistake with a fall on her final pass— her first fall of the season on any of the events. She then showed good performances on the remaining three events to help UCLA win their first team championships in eight years.

2018–2019 season
On February 10, Ross earned her first perfect 10 on vault.  On March 16, Ross completed a "gymslam" after earning her first perfect 10 on floor exercise.  At the PAC-12 Championships Ross scored a 10 on both uneven bars and floor exercise.  Having scored a second perfect 10 on floor, Ross became the second gymnast after Maggie Nichols of Oklahoma to have recorded two gymslams (having scored at least two perfect 10s on each apparatus) and the first to do so in one season. On April 6, Ross tied the record with Karin Lichey for the most career perfect 10s on uneven bars with 9 perfect 10s. During the 2019 season, Ross set the NCAA record for the most perfect 10s in one season with 14. She also set the NCAA record for most consecutive meets with a perfect 10 with 10 straight meets.

At the NCAA Championships, Ross scored a 9.95 on both vault and floor, making her co-champion on each event alongside Nichols, Kennedi Edney of LSU, and Derrian Gobourne of Auburn for vault and Alicia Boren of Florida, Lynnzee Brown of Denver, and Brenna Dowell of Oklahoma for floor. She is the second NCAA gymnast to be a national champion on each event. However, she missed out on the all-around title after an uncharacteristic step on her dismount off the uneven bars, finishing second to Nichols in the all-around. In the first Four on the Floor finals, she was the top scorer for UCLA on vault, bars and beam scoring two 9.95s on vault and bars and a 9.925 on beam in addition to a 9.9125 on floor. Her scores contributed to a 3rd-place finish for UCLA after the team struggled on beam and floor.

2019–2020 season
Ross helped UCLA finish second in the opening meet of the season, the Collegiate Challenge, finishing behind Oklahoma. Individually Ross finished first in the all-around, beating reigning NCAA all-around champion Maggie Nichols. She also recorded the highest vault, balance beam, and floor exercise score at the competition. On January 12, at a meet against Boise State, Ross earned a perfect 10 on uneven bars, her first of the 2020 season and her first perfect 10 on the apparatus at Pauley Pavilion. Furthermore, Ross finished first in the all-around for the second week in a row; she also won the meet titles for the uneven bars and floor exercise. On January 18, Ross received a second perfect 10 on uneven bars for the second meet in a row, winning the meet title for the uneven bars; she also won the meet titles for the vault, beam and all-around. On March 8, Ross recorded her first perfect 10 on vault for the season. The 2019–20 season was cut short due to the COVID-19 pandemic, which prompted the NCAA and PAC-12 to cancel all regular season and championship events. In April, Ross was awarded the Honda Sports Award for gymnastics, beating out finalists Lexy Ramler, Trinity Thomas, and Maggie Nichols. Additionally Ross was named Pac-12 Gymnast of the Year for the second season in a row and finished the season undefeated in the all-around for the eight appearances she made.

Ross concluded her final season with the following accolades:
 2020 Pac-12 Gymnast of the Year
 2020 West Region Gymnast of the Year
 2020 Honda Sports Award winner (top gymnast)
 2020 AAI Award finalist (top senior gymnast)
 2020 AAU James E. Sullivan Award finalist (top amateur athlete)
 2019–2020 Daily Bruin Sports UCLA Athlete of the Year

Career Perfect 10.0

Regular season ranking

Coaching career 
For the 2020–21 season Ross remained at UCLA to finish her degree in molecular, cell, and developmental biology.  She joined the UCLA coaching staff as an Undergraduate Assistant Coach.

On August 13, 2021, the University of Arkansas announced that Ross would join the coaching staff as the volunteer assistant coach for the 2021–22 season, coaching alongside her 2012 Olympic teammate Jordyn Wieber and her former UCLA teammate Felicia Hano.  In July 2022 she was promoted to assistant coach.

Competitive history

World and Olympic score breakdown

Awards

References

External links

 
 
 
 
 
 
 

1996 births
Living people
American female artistic gymnasts
American sportspeople of Filipino descent
American sportspeople of Japanese descent
American sportspeople of Puerto Rican descent
Gymnasts at the 2012 Summer Olympics
Olympic gold medalists for the United States in gymnastics
Medalists at the 2012 Summer Olympics
Medalists at the World Artistic Gymnastics Championships
Sportspeople from Honolulu
Sportspeople from Aliso Viejo, California
UCLA Bruins women's gymnasts
NCAA gymnasts who have scored a perfect 10
U.S. women's national team gymnasts
Aliso Niguel High School alumni